Les Stopford (born 9 May 1942) is an English footballer, who played as an inside forward in the Football League for Chester.

References

Chester City F.C. players
Rhyl F.C. players
Association football inside forwards
English Football League players
Living people
1942 births
Footballers from Manchester
English footballers